Naila or Na'ila (ِArabic: نائلة) is female given name of Arabic origin meaning The attainer, the achiever and the successful one.

Notable people 
Naila Al Atrash, Syrian actress and director
Na'ila bint al-Furafisa was the wife of the third caliph Uthman.
Naila Boss, British rapper
Naila Faran, Saudi doctor
Naila Hassan, New Zealand police officer
Naila Isayeva, Azerbaijani pedagogue
Naila Kabeer, Indian-Bangladeshi economist
Naila Al Moosawi, Emirati executive
Naila Munir, Pakistani politician
Naila Musayeva, Azerbaijani professor
Naila Nayem, Bangladeshi model and actress
Naila Nazir (cricketer), Pakistani cricketer
Naila Nazir (flight attendant), Pakistani flight attendant

See also
Neyla (disambiguation)
Nayla

Arabic feminine given names
Bosnian feminine given names
English feminine given names
Pakistani feminine given names
Indian feminine given names